Yuriy Krot (born 28 May 1968) is a former Belarusian footballer and currently a coach. From 2005 till 2015 he was a head coach of Slutsk, a team which he led from the regional amateur league to Belarusian Premier League.

References

External links
 Profile at teams.by
 Profile at pressball.by
 Profile at Soccerway

1968 births
Living people
People from Slutsk
Belarusian footballers
Association football midfielders
Belarusian expatriate footballers
Expatriate footballers in Poland
Belarusian expatriate sportspeople in Poland
Expatriate footballers in Slovakia
Belarusian expatriate sportspeople in Slovakia
FC Naftan Novopolotsk players
FC Shakhtyor Soligorsk players
ŠK Futura Humenné players
Slovak Super Liga players
FC Granit Mikashevichi players
Belarusian football managers
FC Slutsk managers
FC Viktoryja Marjina Horka managers
Sportspeople from Minsk Region